São Paio de Oleiros is a Portuguese parish, located in the town of Santa Maria da Feira. The population in 2011 was 4,069, in an area of 3.91 km2.

The only hospital of the town of Santa Maria da Feira was once located in São Paio de Oleiros, after the opening of a bigger hospital in municipality, Feira, in the late 1990s, the hospital of São Paio de Oleiros was closed.

São Paio de Oleiros is known for its cork industries.

Culture
São Paio de Oleiros public library.
Grupo Musical de São Paio de Oleiros
"Associação Musical Oleirense" (AMO).

Sport
The three main sport institutions are:
Centro Desportivo e Cultural (badminton and handball)
Escola de Ciclismo Fernando Carvalho (cycling)
Grupo Desportivo São Paio de Oleiros (football and athletics)

References

Freguesias of Santa Maria da Feira